Maurice Daniel Robert Malpas (born 3 August 1962) is a Scottish former football player and coach. He signed for Dundee United in 1979 and spent his entire professional playing career with the club until his retirement in 2000. With him, United were Scottish champions in 1983 and Scottish Cup winners in 1994. European runs there included reaching the 1983–84 European Cup semi final and the 1987 UEFA Cup Final.

Malpas made his debut for the Scotland national team in 1984. He went on to gain 55 caps, making him a member of the Scotland national football team roll of honour. He played for Scotland at two World Cups and one UEFA European Championship final tournaments.
 
Malpas began a coaching career in 1991 whilst still a Dundee United player, continuing as a coach after his retirement until leaving the club in 2003. He joined Motherwell as assistant manager to Terry Butcher before becoming manager from 2006 until 2007. He coached the Scotland under-21 team on a temporary basis before another brief spell in club management with Swindon Town during 2008. More recently he has been assistant manager to Butcher at both Inverness Caledonian Thistle and Hibernian.

Playing career

Dundee United
Malpas was born in Dunfermline, Fife and played youth football for Leven Royals.

He signed for Dundee United in August 1979. His total of 830 competitive first team appearances is the second highest in the club's history. Malpas initially combined his football career with studying for an electrical engineering degree at Dundee College of Technology (now Abertay University), and didn't become a full-time professional until 1984. Despite this, he made his debut in for Dundee United in 1981 and won the Scottish Football League Premier Division title in 1983. In the subsequent 1983–84 European Cup, United reached the semi final.

United made it to the final of the 1986–87 UEFA Cup; en-route they defeated Terry Venables' FC Barcelona side home and away in the quarter-final, and inflicted a first home defeat on Borussia Mönchengladbach in 55 European games going back to 1970 in the semi-final. They lost 2–1 on aggregate to IFK Gothenburg in the final, the second leg of which was their 70th match of the season.

United and Malpas played in five Scottish Cup finals in nine years: in 1985 they took the lead but lost 2–1 to Celtic. In 1987 (played in between the two legs of the UEFA Cup final) they lost 1–0 St Mirren. In 1988 against Celtic, the pattern of 1985 was almost repeated but this time it was an even later goal which defeated United. In 1991, they suffered a 4–3 extra time defeat to Motherwell. Captain Malpas lifted the trophy when Craig Brewster scored the only goal in the 1994 Scottish Cup Final win against Rangers.

Malpas won the SFWA Footballer of the Year award in 1991. His long service was rewarded with two testimonial matches, in 1991 and 2000. He was inducted into the Dundee United Hall of Fame as one of its inaugural members in 2008.

Scotland
Winning first of his caps in 1984,  Malpas is the most recent part-time professional to have played for Scotland. He won 55 caps in total. In his 50th international appearance (away to Norway in June 1992) he was made captain to mark the occasion. He appeared for Scotland at the 1986 and 1990 World Cups and at Euro 1992.

Coaching and managerial career
After retiring as a player, Malpas assumed full-time coaching duties at Tannadice, having been acting as player/coach since 1991. He was part of the temporary management team following the dismissal of Alex Smith in October 2002, but left the club in January 2003.

He initially joined Motherwell as assistant manager to former coaching colleague Terry Butcher. Malpas became Motherwell manager in May 2006, following Butcher's departure to coach Sydney FC. He left the club in June 2007 after one season in charge, having taken the team from a comfortable mid-table position to one that narrowly avoided relegation. Malpas became caretaker manager of the Scotland under-21 team in August 2007, but missed out on the permanent position to Billy Stark.

In January 2008, Malpas became manager of Swindon Town after the takeover of the club by local businessman Andrew Fitton, replacing former Dundee United teammate Paul Sturrock. Malpas was sacked by chairman Andrew Fitton on 14 November 2008 after a poor run of results and shock exits in the FA Cup to Histon and in the Football League Trophy within a week. He joined Terry Butcher again as assistant, this time at SPL club Inverness Caledonian Thistle. In 2013, Malpas moved with Butcher to Hibernian, rejecting the chance to manage Inverness. Butcher and Malpas both left Hibernian in June 2014, after the club had been relegated from the Scottish Premiership.

Malpas became director of football at Raith Rovers on 26 December 2014. He left Raith Rovers on 22 May 2015 and was inducted to the Scottish Football Hall of Fame in October 2015.

Malpas returned to Inverness Caledonian Thistle in April 2017, working for manager Richie Foran.

Managerial statistics

Honours

Club
 Dundee United
 Scottish League Premier Division: 1982–83
 Scottish Cup: 1993–94
Runner-up 1984–85, 1986–87, 1987–88, 1990–91
 Scottish League Cup runner-up: 1984–85, 1997–98
 UEFA Cup runner-up: 1986–87
 Scottish Challenge Cup runner-up: 1995–96

Individual
SFWA Footballer of the Year: 1991
Scottish FA International Roll of Honour: 1992
Scottish Football Hall of Fame inductee: 2015

See also
 List of footballers in Scotland by number of league appearances (500+)
List of one-club men in association football
List of Scotland national football team captains

References

External links

1962 births
1986 FIFA World Cup players
1990 FIFA World Cup players
Dundee United F.C. non-playing staff
Dundee United F.C. players
Hibernian F.C. non-playing staff
Inverness Caledonian Thistle F.C. non-playing staff
Living people
Motherwell F.C. managers
Motherwell F.C. non-playing staff
Scotland international footballers
Scotland under-21 international footballers
Scottish Football League players
Scottish football managers
Scottish footballers
Scottish Premier League managers
Scottish Premier League players
Footballers from Dunfermline
Swindon Town F.C. managers
English Football League managers
UEFA Euro 1992 players
Scotland national under-21 football team managers
Scottish Football Hall of Fame inductees
Association football fullbacks